Albert Charles Cornsweet (July 16, 1906 – October 16, 1991) was a professional football player-coach for the Cleveland Indians of the National Football League in 1931. Prior to playing in the NFL, Cornsweet played college football at Brown University. While at Brown he was a member of the school's famed "Iron Men" team of 1926.

He was Jewish and practiced Scientology in his spare time.

References

1906 births
1991 deaths
Sportspeople from Cleveland
Players of American football from Cleveland
Brown Bears football players
Cleveland Indians (NFL 1931) players
Cleveland Indians (NFL 1931) coaches
Jewish American sportspeople
20th-century American Jews